Hergatz station is the station of the Bavarian town of Hergatz. It has three platforms sidings and is classified by Deutsche Bahn as a category 5 station. The station is served by about 75 trains daily operated by Deutsche Bahn and Regentalbahn. Hergatz station is a separation station at the junction of the Buchloe–Lindau railway (Munich–Lindau) and the Kißlegg–Hergatz railway.

Apart from Hergatz station, the municipality of Hergatz includes the closed stations of Maria Thann and Wohmbrechts.

Location

The station is located in the centre of Hergatz. The station building is located south of the tracks and has the address of Bahnhofstraße 4. Bahnhofstraße (station street) runs to the south of the station. The Hauptstraße (main street) crosses the tracks over a level crossing to the east of the station. To the west there is a pedestrian bridge.

History

Hergatz  station was opened on 12 October 1853 with the last section of the Bavarian Allgäu Railway from Oberstaufen to Lindau as part of the Ludwig South-North Railway. The opening of the section from Buchloe to Kaufering on 1 November 1872 created a direct connection with Munich. The station initially had five platform tracks and several freight tracks. It also had freight loading facilities and a freight shed. The three-storey station building was built with the construction of the Allgäu Railway and it has an annex at both ends. Tracks have been dismantled since 1970. The freight tracks were demolished and only three platform tracks remain for passenger traffic. Platforms were formerly reached over level crossings.

The station was modernised in 2003. The main platform was retained, but it was raised to 55 cm. The track work between tracks 2 and 3 was demolished and replaced by a large central platform, also 55 cm high. Both platforms were given canopies. An underpass was also built from the central platform to the main platform. Lift shafts were built but no lifts have been installed as the funding for this purpose has been cut by the federal government at stations with a daily ridership of less than 1,000 people. However, it is planned, with new financing, to install the lifts to give access to the central platform for the disabled.  In 2012, Deutsche Bahn sold the station building to a private owner; the municipality of Hergatz refused to purchase it, despite an offer by Deutsche Bahn. It was unclear whether the station building would continue to be open to the public, now it is closed. In 1977, a Lorenz track plan push button interlocking of class 60 (SpDrL60) went into operation in Hergatz signal box which is located in the station building. It is expected to be replaced by an electronic interlocking controlled from Lindau in 2018.

Infrastructure

The station has three tracks on two platforms. Track 1 is located on the main platform next to the station building and is used by trains towards Augsburg, Kempten and Munich. Track 2 is served by regional trains to Lindau and Kißlegg and infrequent Regionalbahn services via Aulendorf to Friedrichshafen run from track 3. All platforms are covered, but are not currently served by lifts so they are not accessible for the disabled. The central platform is connected by a subway to the main platform. All platforms at the station are 170 metres long and 55 cm high.

Operations

Hergatz station has been served since 9 December 2007 by alex (until 2010: Arriva Länderbahn-Express) services operated by Regentalbahn between Munich and Lindau and Oberstdorf. Since 10 December 2006, the Allgäu-Franken-Express has run two to three times each day with trains composed of class 612 diesel multiple units between Nuremberg and Lindau. Regional-Express services operated with class 612 railcars complement the Allgäu-Franken-Express between Augsburg and Lindau every two hours. Regional-Express services formed of class 612 railcars operate between Ulm and Kempten, with some trains continuing via Hergatz to Lindau or Wangen. Every two hours class 628 or 650 diesel railcars run on the Regionalbahn route from Lindau via Hergatz, Wangen (Allgäu) and Kißlegg to Aulendorf. At Kißlegg there is a connection to the Regionalbahn service to Memmingen.

Notes

Railway stations in Bavaria
Railway stations in Germany opened in 1853
Buildings and structures in Lindau (district)
1853 establishments in Bavaria